Tenellia destinyae is a species of sea slug, an aeolid nudibranch, a marine gastropod mollusc in the family Fionidae.

Distribution
This species was described from specimens found at 0 m depth on a ship's hull at Zihuatanejo, Guerrero, Mexico, tropical eastern Pacific.

References 

Fionidae
Gastropods described in 2007